Raji Abdel-Aati is a Sudanese football midfielder for the Sudanese giants El-Merreikh. He is a member of the Sudan national football team. He was brought from Ahli Al Khartoum in December 2008 to El-Merreikh. He scored his first goal for El-Merreikh in a friendly match against Al-Wakra of Qatar in Qatar from a penalty in which the visitors won 0:2.

References

Living people
Association football midfielders
Sudanese footballers
Sudan international footballers
2011 African Nations Championship players
Al-Merrikh SC players
1985 births
Sudan A' international footballers